The Legend of William Tell is a 16-part television fantasy/drama series produced in 1998 by Cloud 9 Productions in New Zealand.  The basic premise of the series — a crossbow-wielding rebel defies a corrupt governor — and the name of the title character were adopted from the traditional story, but the series was set in a fantasy world and featured supernatural themes.

Described by executive producer Raymond Thompson as "Star Wars on the planet Earth", this is a fantasy saga of bravery, magic, myth and romance. William Tell is the youthful leader of a band of young, ‘brat pack' outlaws, forever hunted by the forces of darkness, led by Xax and Kreel, who have usurped power in their homeland. The series of self-contained stories follows Will's quest to restore young Princess Vara to her rightful place on the royal throne and defeat Xax and Kreel's forces — and by doing so, bring back peace and order to the Kingdom of Kale.

There is action and adventure along the way, magic, creatures, mystery, intrigue — but also much human drama and interplay among Will's rebel band who must support each other in their quest. The group encounter a diverse range of people and situations on their journey — some help the resistance movement, others are cohorts of Xax and Kreel.

Filmed on location throughout New Zealand, the series makes use of natural scenery and has high production values.

The Legend of William Tell also aired in Sri Lanka National Television with Sinhala subtitles and on Vietnam Television (18:00 VTV3) with Vietnamese voicing.

Cast
Kieren Hutchison as William Tell
Andrew Binns as Xax
Nathaniel Lees as Leon
Katrina Browne as Aruna
Ray Henwood as Kreel
Sharon Tyrell as Kalem
Beth Allen as Princess Vara
Drew Neemia as Drogo

Episodes

Season 1 (1998–1999)

References

External links
 

New Zealand drama television series
1990s New Zealand television series
1998 New Zealand television series debuts
1999 New Zealand television series endings
Cultural depictions of William Tell
New Zealand fantasy television series
Television shows set in Switzerland